"On the Run" is the third track from British progressive rock band Pink Floyd's 1973 album, The Dark Side of the Moon. It is an instrumental piece performed on an EMS synthesizer (Synthi AKS). It deals with the pressures of travel, specifically air travel, which according to Richard Wright, would often bring fear of death.

Composition
This piece was created by entering an 8-note sequence into a Synthi AKS synthesiser made by the British synthesiser manufacturer EMS and speeding it up, with an added white noise generator creating the hi-hat sound. The band then added backwards guitar parts, created by dragging a microphone stand down the fretboard, reversing the tape, and panning left to right. There are also other Synthi and VCS 3 synthesizer parts, made to sound like a vehicle passing, giving a Doppler effect. The 8 note sequence is played at a tempo of 165 BPM, while both filter frequency and resonance are modulated. Near the end, the only guitar part is heard: a chord over the explosion of the presumed aircraft. This gradually fades, segueing into the chiming clocks introduction of the following "Time".

When The Dark Side of the Moon was performed in 1972 (before the album was released), it went under the title "The Travel Sequence" and was a more simple guitar jam, without synthesisers and other electronic instruments. A short clip of this is on the DVD Classic Albums: Pink Floyd – The Making of The Dark Side of the Moon and can be heard on all performances of Pink Floyd playing the album in that year.

Voices
 Twenty-seven seconds into the piece, a female voice on a loudspeaker can be heard; apparently an airport public address system. She says, "Have your baggage and passport ready and then follow the green line to customs and immigration. BA 215 to Rome, Cairo and Lagos." Engineer Alan Parsons reused this sample on the "Sea Lions in the Departure Lounge" bonus track of the 2007 deluxe edition of Tales of Mystery and Imagination by the Alan Parsons Project.
 At 1:54, Roger "The Hat" Manifold, Pink Floyd road manager says, "Live for today, gone tomorrow – that's me," then laughs.

Reception
In a contemporary review for The Dark Side of the Moon, Loyd Grossman of Rolling Stone described "On the Run" as a "standout with footsteps racing from side to side successfully eluding any number of odd malevolent rumbles and explosions only to be killed off by the clock's ticking that leads into "Time."

Live performances
During the first official performance of Dark Side of the Moon, at the Rainbow Theatre on 17 February 1972, a version of this song was played with guitar, keyboard and drums instead of the synthesizer track that appeared on the album. Subsequent performances matched the album version and, at the end of the song, a model aeroplane would fly from one end of the arena to the other, appearing to crash in a brilliant explosion. The same effect was used in the A Momentary Lapse of Reason tour, but with a flying bed rather than an aeroplane. The Division Bell tour would reuse the aeroplane, only this time with the back of it in flames for additional effects.

A live version of the song can be heard on the Delicate Sound of Thunder concert video, although it did not appear on the album release, however, it appears on the 2019 reissue and remixed version of the album. Another live version appears on the CD, vinyl, and DVD releases of Pulse.

Roger Waters and his solo band performed this song live from 2006 to 2008 during his tour, The Dark Side of the Moon Live.

The song was used by longtime public address announcers Tommy Edwards and Ray Clay of the Chicago Bulls organization during the Michael Jordan era as the theme for the visiting team at Bulls home games.  This also marked the first use of songs of any kind in the live setting in the NBA.

During their 1970s "Musicradio" era, Chicago radio station WLS-AM 890 used part of the song as background music for recorded prize and contest phone calls that were played on-air.

Personnel
 David Gilmour – electric guitar, EMS Synthi AKS
 Roger Waters – EMS VCS 3, tape effects
 Richard Wright – Hammond organ, Leslie speaker
 Nick Mason – percussion (heartbeat), tape effects

with:

 Peter James – footsteps
 Roger "The Hat" Manifold – spoken vocal

Other versions
 The Seatbelts cover the song on the Cowboy Bebop soundtrack.
 The music for the video game Delta for Commodore 64 is heavily inspired by this song.
 The song was covered by The Flaming Lips along with the rest of Pink Floyd's album The Dark Side of the Moon.
 Shpongle appears to have done a version of the song in the track "Tickling the Amygdala" from the album Museum of Consciousness.

References
Footnotes

Citations

1973 songs
Pink Floyd songs
Rock instrumentals
Experimental music compositions
Songs written by David Gilmour
Songs written by Roger Waters
Song recordings produced by David Gilmour
Song recordings produced by Roger Waters
Song recordings produced by Richard Wright (musician)
Song recordings produced by Nick Mason